Pannaikadu is a panchayat town in Dindigul district in the Indian state of Tamil Nadu.

History
The majority of population here are from a specific community called 24Manai telugu chettiar. The People here speak modified Telugu, while Tamil is also a very Commonly used language. In this Village it has two divisions namely Aladipatty and Ooralpatty. There was a Government Hospital which was a midpoint between these two divisions.

Geography 
The town covers an area of 32 square kilometers.the main water source is aruganal and solamalai river water

Climate 
Under the Köppen–Geiger climate classification system, Pannaikadu has a tropical savanna climate (Aw). Annually, the town averages a temperature of 20.7°C and precipitation of 1345 mm.

Demographics 
 Indian census, there were 2,493 households in the town and a population of 8731. The average literacy rate of the town is 76% with male literacy of 82% and female literacy of 71%.

References

External links 
Town profile - Pannaikadu Town Panchayat 

Cities and towns in Dindigul district